"Nothin' at All" is a song written by pop and musical theatre composer Mark Mueller that was recorded by American rock band Heart. It came out as the fourth single from the group's self-titled 1985 album, the Capitol Records release Heart, and was the fourth song from the album to hit the U.S. Top 10.

A Billboard Hot 100 hit that specifically peaked at #10, becoming their 9th and last top 10 hit, it received significant attention amongst the musical releases of 1986. The song additionally was a Top 40 hit in the United Kingdom, peaking at #38 in 1988 (after reaching #76 in the U.K. Singles Chart two years earlier during its original release).

Musically, the track represents an embrace of the new wave and power pop styles of radio-friendly rock songs of the early to middle 1980s (akin to contemporary U.S. groups such as The Cars) with elements such as strident keyboard playing mixed in with an emphasis on rhythm guitar. This artistic choice was a softening from the heavier sound of earlier releases by Heart that were closer to hard rock while retaining the same melodramatic balladry driven songwriting.

Background and music video
The track functions as a love song that describes a new romantic relationship which falls into place without any interpersonal conflict or even real effort. The song's title phrase is employed twice: both when the narrator describes the new relationship as being like "nothin' at all" (compared to everything else that she's previously experienced) and additionally when she asks the song's subject what he did to make falling in love so easy (him giving the exact response of "nothin' at all"). 

The music video for "Nothin' At All" touches on the lyrical content of the song only abstractly and features a combination of comedic elements such as Ann and Nancy Wilson debating each other on fashion choices as well as numerous moments of a large black panther stalking different environments in a darkened building plus band members either miming to the track or pretending to play instruments. As of December 2022, it has been well-received on YouTube, with the release featuring over nine million views.

Reception
The U.S. publication Cash Box stated that "Ann Wilson’s ever exhilarating vocal force is dynamic as ever here, aided by sizzling rock guitar musicianship."

Music critic Joe Viglione of Allmusic praised the track for how it "explodes off the turntable", in his view, and he additionally remarked that it incorporates a "mix which is arguably producer Ron Nevison's finest moment."

Remixes

"Nothin' At All" & "Never" both have alternate mixes (as featured on their music videos), and these mixes had also been pressed onto some early release runs of the "Heart" album, be it on LP, CD or cassette. One may get a copy with both songs in their original mixes; both in their alternate mixes, or only one song in a different mix. Copies with serial No. SL-12410, for example, features the alternate mix for "Never," but the original mix for "Nothin' At All." It appears that the original mix of "Nothin' At All" only appeared on various editions of early LP & cassette runs, and later featured on the "Essentials" Collection. The 45RPM record featured the remix, thus receiving the most airplay on Top-40 radio formats of that day.

The two versions of "Nothin' At All" greatly differ from one another, in contrast to the two mixes of "Never" which are more similar. The original mix of "Nothin' At All" features a more subdued lead vocal from Ann Wilson. The guitar solo sounds drastically different from the remix because it was actually performed by Survivor guitarist Frankie Sullivan, a guest on the album. In the remix, a vibrant alternate lead vocal take from Wilson is featured with striking embellishments; Leese's guitar solo is vastly different and has a harmonic solo with Wilson. Drum treatment was mixed with restraint in the original, with heavy reverb as to blend with other instruments; louder, dryer & "cuts-through" on the remix. But while these two versions greatly differ from one another, the underscoring rhythm tracks are exactly the same, most notable in the strong bass line, hence it appears the two final mixes do not derive from different basic track recording sessions.

The UK 12" and CD single releases of "Nothin' At All" featured an extended remix clocking in at 5:20.

Charts

See also

1986 in music
Heart discography

References 

1985 songs
1986 singles
Capitol Records singles
Heart (band) songs
Song recordings produced by Ron Nevison
Songs written by Mark Mueller